Younes Nemouchi (born 16 September 1993) is an Algerian boxer. He competed in the men's middleweight event at the 2020 Summer Olympics.

References

External links
 

1993 births
Living people
Algerian male boxers
Olympic boxers of Algeria
Boxers at the 2020 Summer Olympics
Place of birth missing (living people)
21st-century Algerian people
Mediterranean Games silver medalists for Algeria
Mediterranean Games medalists in boxing
Competitors at the 2022 Mediterranean Games